Agradigun is a Union Council of Dhamoirhat Upazila in the District of Naogaon, Bangladesh. It is situated in the north-western part of the district town Naogaon next to Indian border. It is around 18 km northern direction from Dhamoirhat Upazila. It has a small bazaar that provides every commodities to its surrounding people. Agradigun Union consists of 34 villages, which are subdivided into 23 mouzas and 5631 khanas. Although it is located in the distant part of the country, Literacy rate of Agradigun Union is more than 65%.

See also
 Shihara Union
 Dhamoirhat Upazila
 Naogaon District

References

Unions of Dhamoirhat Upazila